Üğrük is a village in the Sivrice District of Elazığ Province in Turkey. The village is populated by Muslim Armenians, Kurds and Muhacir Turks, and had a population of 43 in 2021. The hamlet of Canbey is attached to the village.

References

Villages in Sivrice District
Kurdish settlements in Elazığ Province